Monday Bassey Etim (born 4 December 1998) is a Nigerian footballer who plays for Danish 2nd Division club FC Roskilde.

Career
After spending time in the Kadji Sports Academy in Cameroon, Etim moved to Florida to join the Montverde Academy. He became the second ever signing for new Major League Soccer franchise Los Angeles FC in April 2017, and was immediately loaned to their United Soccer League affiliate Orange County SC.

On 15 July 2019, Etim signed a 2-year contract with Danish 1st Division club FC Roskilde after two weeks trial.

References

External links
 
 

1998 births
Living people
Nigerian footballers
Nigerian expatriate footballers
Los Angeles FC players
Orange County SC players
Rio Grande Valley FC Toros players
FC Roskilde players
USL Championship players
Danish 1st Division players
Association football midfielders
People from Calabar
Nigerian expatriate sportspeople in the United States
Expatriate soccer players in the United States
Nigerian expatriate sportspeople in Denmark
Expatriate men's footballers in Denmark
Montverde Academy alumni